Minkhaung (also spelled Mingaung or Minhkaung) was a Burmese royal title, and may refer to:

Monarchs
 Minkhaung I, King of Ava, r. 1400–1421
 Minkhaung II, King of Ava, r. 1480–1501
 Minkhaung of Mrauk-U, King of Mrauk-U, r. 1521–1531
 Minkhaung of Prome, King of Prome, r. 1539–1542

Royalty
 Minkhaung Medaw of Ava, Princess of Ava, 1367–?
 Minkhaung Medaw, Queen consort of Pegu, r. 1535–1539; Queen consort of Mrauk-U, r. 1540–1554
 Minkhaung I of Toungoo, Viceroy of Toungoo, r. 1446–1451
 Minkhaung II of Toungoo, Viceroy of Toungoo, r. 1549–1584

Military personnel
 Minkhaung Nawrahta, Konbaung-era general, 1752–1760
 "Teingya" Minkhaung, Konbaung-era general, 1752–1769

Other uses
 Taungoo Mingaung, one of the Thirty Seven nats

Burmese royal titles